Roman Huseynov (born on 26 December 1997) is an Azerbaijani football midfielder who last played for Kapaz in the Azerbaijan Premier League.

Career

Club
On 15 August 2015, Huseynov made his debut in the Azerbaijan Premier League for Gabala match against Shuvalan.

On 25 June 2021, Huseynov signed a one-year contract with Sumgayit. On 6 January 2022, after making 4 appearances for the club, Huseynov was released by Sumgayit.

Statistics

Club

Honours
Gabala
Azerbaijan Cup (1): 2018–19

References

External links
 

1997 births
Living people
Association football midfielders
Azerbaijani footballers
Azerbaijan youth international footballers
Azerbaijan Premier League players
Gabala FC players
Kapaz PFK players
Sumgayit FK players